Micrurus browni, commonly known as Brown's coral snake, is a species of venomous snake in the family Elapidae. The species is native to Guatemala and southwestern  Mexico. There are three recognized subspecies, including the nominate subspecies described here.

Etymology
The specific name, browni, is in honor of American herpetologist Bryce Cardigan Brown (1920–2008).

Spanish common names
Common names for M. browni in Spanish include Serpiente-coralillo de Brown, coral, coral de Acapulco, coral de Antigua, coral (or coralillo) de canutos, and vibora de coral.

Description
It has smooth dorsal scales, a rounded head, and eyes with round pupils. Its color pattern is three-colored: broad red rings, separated by 10-27 black rings, each black ring bordered by two narrow yellow bands. The snout is black. There is usually a yellow band, across the top of the head, halfway back.

Geographic range
The geographic distribution of M. browni is limited to Quintana Roo in southwestern Mexico, and western Guatemala, including Sacatepequez.  Previous reports for Honduras have been found to be incorrect.

Habitat

Behavior
Although little is known about the behavior of M. browni, like most other coral snakes it may be nocturnal, terrestrial and probably dwells in burrows, leaf litter, or under logs. While usually not aggressive, it will bite when molested or restrained.

Diet
M. browni feeds on small lizards, amphibians, invertebrates, and other snakes.

Reproduction
Like other members of the genus Micrurus, M. browni  is oviparous and may lay a maximum of 15 eggs per clutch.

Venom
Little is known about the effects of M. browni venom. It may contain neurotoxin, which can cause neuromuscular dysfunction, as is the case with the venom of other coral snakes.

Subspecies
The following three subspecies of Micrurus browni are recognized as being valid.

Micrurus browni browni Schmidt & H.M. Smith, 1943 
Micrurus browni importunus Roze, 1967
Micrurus browni taylori Schmidt & H.M. Smith, 1943

The subspecific name, taylori, is in honor of American herpetologist Edward Harrison Taylor.

References

Further reading
Heimes P (2016). Snakes of Mexico: Herpetofauna Mexicana Vol. I. Frankfurt am Main, Germany: Chimaira. 572 pp. .
Roze J (1967). "A Check List of the New World Venomous Coral Snakes (Elapidae), with Descriptions of New Forms". American Museum Novitates (2287): 1–60. (Micrurus browni importunus, new subspecies, pp. 11–12 + Figure 4).
Schmidt KP, Smith HM (1943). "Notes on coral snakes from México". Field Museum of Natural History Zoological Series  29 (2): 25-31. (Micrurus browni, new species, pp. 29–30; Micrurus nuchalis taylori, new subspecies, pp. 30–31).

browni
Snakes of Central America
Reptiles of Mexico
Reptiles of Guatemala
Reptiles described in 1943